Miracles (released under various titles for several territories worldwide) is a 1989 Hong Kong action film starring and directed by Jackie Chan. The film is set in 1930s Hong Kong and is a variation of Frank Capra's Lady for a Day (1933) and Pocketful of Miracles (1961), which in turn were based on "Madame La Gimp", a 1929 short story by Damon Runyon. The film is written by Edward Tang with inputs from Chan.

Miracles features many well-known Hong Kong actors, including Anita Mui and Wu Ma, and is considered one of Jackie Chan's most sophisticated directorial efforts. Chan is an ardent fan of Hollywood musicals, and Miracles pays a tribute to that genre. According to his autobiography, Chan stated that this was one of his favorite films he has made. The film was remade in Hindi as Singh Is Kinng with Akshay Kumar and Katrina Kaif.

Plot
Chan plays Kuo Cheng-Wah, a kind-hearted country boy who is quickly cheated out of all his money by Tung (Bill Tung) when he arrives in Hong Kong. Depressed and destitute, he encounters Madame Kao (Gua Ah-leh), a poor woman selling flowers on the street; she urges him to buy a red rose, saying it will bring him luck. He disagrees at first but after looking at his suitcase, he finally agrees.

His fortunes immediately take a dramatic turn when he stumbles into a gang war, and renders assistance to a dying gang leader. When Fei (Lo Lieh) asks who will take his spot, the gang leader unwittingly makes Kuo his successor and dies. Kuo, awed, attributes his luck to Madame Kao's rose, and takes to buying one from her every day thereafter. This does not sit well with the gang, especially Fei, who feels that he was next in line to be the boss. Uncle Hoi (Wu Ma), the boss' right-hand man, helps Kuo adjust to being the boss. In a fight to test his toughness, Kuo wins the gang's respect, with the exception of Fei.

Kuo reluctantly accepts being a gangster boss and tries to find a different way to legitimately make a living for himself and his gang. When singer Yang Luming (Anita Mui) comes to him with money to pay off a debt the previous boss had loaned to her dad, Uncle Hoi comes up with the idea to open a nightclub. At the opening of the nightclub, rival boss Tiger comes to enjoy the nightclub, being introduced to Kuo. Before the music starts, the police and Inspector Ho (Richard Ng) interrupts the show. In Kuo's office, Ho privately tells him his plan to bring both gangs to jail. Ho leaves Kuo with Uncle Hoi, who tells Kuo everyone knows what they talked about since Ho always uses the same lines.

Before a meeting with Tiger, Kuo goes to buy his usual rose from Madame Kao, but she is not at her post. Because of this, he is caught up at a fight in a restaurant. The fight ends when Tiger stops a fan from falling on Kuo, who dives out of his way to grab a rose. About to be taken for ransom by Tiger, he is saved again by Inspector Ho. Afterwards, Kuo searches for Madame Kao, and finds her terribly upset over a letter she has just received. The letter is from her daughter, Belle (Gloria Yip), a student in Shanghai whom Madame Kao has been supporting, all the time while concealing her sufferings and leading her to believe that she is a rich society woman in Hong Kong.

She now comes to visit, bringing her wealthy fiance and his father, but Madame Kao is afraid that her poverty will bring disgrace to her daughter. Through Luming's persuasion, Kuo offers to help, buying Madame Kao expensive new clothes and arranging a lavish party for her, to which he invites some of his disreputable friends, including Tung as her husband (that he almost did not remember), on the condition that they impersonate the local dignitaries. Also Kuo accidentally agrees to the wedding in which he later on decides to get the gangs to act as rich dignitaries with mixed results. Most importantly, his gang ties up photographers and business people, fearing that they might reveal Kao's sad true nature.

Meanwhile, Fei has manipulated Tiger into thinking Kuo had some of his men killed when they were trying to bring him in for a negotiation. In reality, they were simply being held captive. On the eve of the party, Kuo tries to get to Inspector Ho but is instead captured by Tiger and taken to a rope factory run by Fei. It is clear to Kuo now that Fei has been behind the scenes of all the strife, but as Tiger is about to shoot Kuo, Tiger's missing men return, proving Kuo's innocence. Tiger sees this as an internal struggle and lets Kuo and Fei sort things out on their own with assurance from Tiger that there is no foul play. After a fight in the factory with Fei's men, Kuo triumphs. Fei is ready to fight Kuo himself, but Kuo wants to solve their issues peacefully, and more importantly get back to Madame Kao's situation, winning Tiger's respect in the process.

After canceling the party and getting rid of the gangs that will play the rich dignitaries, Kuo tries to convince the real dignitaries of Hong Kong to help him. Madame Kao is about to confess to Belle's fiance and her father the truth when the real dignitaries come in for the party, Kuo having convinced them that he could not do this without them. This leaves everyone crying in relief, pulling off the illusion till the end.

As Belle and her fiance take a ship back to Shanghai, everyone is there to see them off. Inspector Ho, wanted for embezzlement and abuse of power when he was conned by Tung, is also on the ship, denouncing Tung as they ship off. Happy with how things turned out, Kuo yells for Belle, her fiancé and his father to come back anytime, much to the horror of everyone who want to go back to their normal lives.

Cast
Jackie Chan as 'Charlie' Kuo Chen Wah
Anita Mui as Yang Luming
Gua Ah-leh as Madam Kao (Lady Rose) (as Yah-Leh Gui)
Chun Hsiung Ko as Tiger
Wu Ma as Uncle Hoi
Lo Lieh as Fei
Bill Tung as Tung
Gloria Yip as Belle Kao
Richard Ng as Chief Inspector Ho
Simon Yam as Chief Inspector Ho's man
Jacky Cheung as Bespectacled Clerk
Billy Lau as Ah Tong
David Lui as Snake Ming
Tien Feng as Elder Ko / Wong
Mars as Police sergeant
Yuen Biao as Beggar (cameo)
Wong Wai as supreme Court Judge
Chor Yuen as chairman of the court
Ken Lo as guard of Tiger
Lee Hoi Shan as guard of Kuo
Suki Kwan as dancer

Production
According to Bey Logan's audio commentary on the Region 2 DVD released by Hong Kong Legends, Edward Tang introduced Chan to Frank Capra's film Pocketful of Miracles (1961). After seeing it, Chan was influenced to produce a film with a 1930s setting. The script by Edward Tang and Jackie Chan expands the backstories of the main characters while staying faithful to the source, with some comic references included and Jackie's trademark action style that sticks to the tone of the light hearted film.

In the interview with Chan on the Hong Kong Legends DVD, he talks about the notable differences between how US directors shoot their films in comparison to his own methods. He gives the example that American filmmakers tend to move the camera to emphasise the frenetic nature of the action, but in action scenes in Chan's films, he keeps the camera steady. Chan also discusses Authur Wong's steady cam crane shot during the song "Rose, Rose I Love You" (sung by Anita Mui). In a single shot, the camera begins with an overhead view of Tiger as he leaves the Ritz. Kuo glances at Tiger and then the camera sweeps left to a top view shot of Yang Luming singing in front of her dancers.

The film's production was beset with problems, including a reported typhoon that destroyed many of the film sets and forced a rebuild in order to finish the production; and Chan sustained an injury, a deep cut over his left eye, while performing a stunt in which he flipped backwards onto a rickshaw.

The film was produced from December 1988 to March 1989.

Release
Miracles was released under several alternate titles in different territories, including:
Mr. Canton and Lady Rose (Hong Kong English title)
The Canton Godfather (Australia)
Gangster (Philippines)
Miracles: The Canton Godfather (United Kingdom video title)
Black Dragon (United States)

International version
The original Hong Kong cut of Miracles had a running time of 127 minutes. Several major scenes were cut for the 102-minute international version. These include:
Kuo Cheng-Wah and Chief Inspector Ho having a private conversation.
Yang Luming's dress is torn and she has an argument with Kuo Cheng-Wah.
Scenes with Chief Inspector Ho in a police station.
Yang Luming talking to Mr Wong on the phone in English.
A subplot between Chief Inspector Ho and Tung about money.
Kuo Cheng-Wah and Yang Luming try to teach the gangs to act as local dignitaries.

Box office
Miracles took HK $34,036,029 at the Hong Kong box office.

Critical response
Rotten Tomatoes, a review aggregator, reports that 60% of five surveyed critics gave the film a positive review; the average rating was 7.2/10.

Accolades
9th Hong Kong Film Awards
Won: Best Action Choreography (Jackie Chan Stunt Team)
Nomination: Best Actor (Jackie Chan)
Nomination: Best Art Direction (Eddie Ma)
Nomination: Best Film Editing (Peter Cheung)

See also
Jackie Chan filmography
List of Hong Kong films

References

External links
Miracles at Jackie Chan.Com

1989 films
1989 comedy-drama films
1980s crime comedy films
1989 martial arts films
1980s Cantonese-language films
Films based on short fiction
Films directed by Jackie Chan
Films set in Hong Kong
Films set in the 1930s
Golden Harvest films
Hong Kong martial arts films
Hong Kong slapstick comedy films
1980s Hong Kong films